Zeppelin LZ 89 (L 50) was an R-class zeppelin of the Imperial German Navy. After a short career during the World War I it ran out of fuel during a mission and was deliberately crashed.

Service 
Airship LZ 89 took part in five missions around the North Sea.

On 20 October 1917 LZ 89 was returning from bombing Norwich when it ran out of fuel. To prevent capture the commander ordered the Zeppelin to do a controlled crash near Dammartin-sur-Meuse where the Zeppelin would be destroyed but allow the crew to safely get off the ship. The airship crashed but after the control car had been torn off the ship drifted off over the Mediterranean with five crew members still on board. Two officers and 14 crewmen of Zeppelin LZ 89 (L 50) were captured and taken prisoners-of-war to Bourbonne-les-Bains.

Specifications (LZ 89 / Type r zeppelin)

See also

List of Zeppelins

Bibliography 
Notes

References 

 

 
 

Airships of Germany
Hydrogen airships
Zeppelins
Aviation accidents and incidents in 1917
Accidents and incidents involving balloons and airships